Juan Pablo Romero (born 2 June 1998) is an Argentine professional footballer who plays as a goalkeeper for Rosario Central.

Career
Romero joined the Rosario Central academy from Club Atlético Elortondo at the end of 2013; after Rosario coach Hugo Gottardi obtained him a trial. Romero was promoted into Kily González's first-team squad at the end of 2020, with his senior debut arriving - as a starter - on 4 December 2020 in a Copa de la Liga Profesional score draw away to Banfield; he had been an unused substitute three times in the preceding November.

Career statistics
.

Notes

References

External links

1998 births
Living people
People from General López Department
Argentine footballers
Association football goalkeepers
Argentine Primera División players
Rosario Central footballers
Sportspeople from Santa Fe Province